Jonathan Walker (born 20 February 1991) is a Scotland international rugby league footballer who plays as a .

He has previously played for the Castleford Tigers (Heritage № 909), Hull Kingston Rovers, Bradford Bulls, Leigh Centurions and the Darlington Point Roosters.

Background
Walker was born in England.

Club career
Walker started his career with Castleford Tigers. In 2009, he was loaned out to Gateshead Thunder, where he made seven appearances. He made his début for Castleford against Wigan Warriors in round 16 of 2010's Super League XV, coming off the interchange bench for his first game.

He joined Hull Kingston Rovers from Castleford Tigers in October 2013. He spent one season at the club before joining Leigh Centurions. He spent 2015 on loan at the London Broncos.

Walker signed a two-year deal with the Bradford Bulls following the 2015 season.

Representative career
Walker has been capped 4 times for Scotland in the 2014 European Cup.

He played in the 2014 European Cup tournament, scoring his first international try in the tournament's opening game against Wales. Walker also played in the 2015 European Cup tournament.

Personal life
Jonathan is the twin brother of the late rugby league player Adam Walker.

References

External links
2017 RLWC profile

1991 births
Living people
Bradford Bulls players
Castleford Tigers players
Dewsbury Rams players
Doncaster R.L.F.C. players
English people of Scottish descent
English rugby league players
Hull Kingston Rovers players
Keighley Cougars players
Leigh Leopards players
London Broncos players
Newcastle Thunder players
Rugby league players from Bradford
Rugby league props
Scotland national rugby league team players
Whitehaven R.L.F.C. players